Louise Shivers (August 15, 1929 – July 26, 2014) was an American author and writer-in-residence at  Georgia Regents University, Augusta, Georgia.

Born in 1929 in Stantonsburg and raised in Wilson, North Carolina, Shivers received a National Endowment for the Arts Fellowship and published two novels. Here to Get My Baby Out of Jail, originally published by Random House, Collins, London, and Editions Belfond in Paris, was named Best First Novel of the Year by USA Today in 1983 and was made into the feature film Summer Heat. The novel is available from John F. Blair Publishers and Google ebooks.  A stage play, Faith's Affair, by Jayetta Slawson based on the novel made its debut in 2006 at Southeastern Louisiana University in Hammond, Louisiana. A Whistling Woman garnered Shivers the Georgia Author of the  Year  award in 1993.

In January 2013, My Shining Hour : A novelist's memoir of World War II was published.

Shivers died of congestive heart failure in Evans, Georgia on July 26, 2014, aged 84.

References

External links 
Shivers bio, per publisher
Shivers 2012 article in The Columbia County News-Times
 https://www.southeastern.edu/news_media/bylion/2006/march_27/index.html#faith

1929 births
2014 deaths
Augusta State University
American women novelists
Novelists from North Carolina
20th-century American novelists
20th-century American memoirists
American women memoirists
20th-century American women writers
People from Stantonsburg, North Carolina
People from Wilson, North Carolina
People from Evans, Georgia
21st-century American women